O. floribunda may refer to:

 Ocotea floribunda, a plant with lauroid leaves
 Olearia floribunda, an Australian plant
 Ouratea floribunda, a wild plane